Kalakkad Mundanthurai Tiger Reserve (KMTR) located in the South Western Ghats montane rain forests in Tirunelveli district and Kanyakumari district in the South Indian state of Tamil Nadu, is the second-largest protected area in Tamil Nadu. It is part of the Agasthyamala Biosphere Reserve.

History
The Kalakkad Mundanthurai Tiger Reserve was created in 1988 by combining Kalakad Wildlife Sanctuary (251 km2) and Mundanthurai Wildlife Sanctuary (567 km2), both established in 1962.  Notification of 77 km2 of parts of Veerapuli and Kilamalai Reserve Forests in adjacent Kanyakumari district, added to the reserve in April 1996, is pending.  A  core area of this reserve has been proposed as a national park.

The continuation of "Project Tiger" in Kalakkad Mundanthurai Tiger Reserve for fiscal year 2010–2011, at the cost of Rs. 19,433,000, was approved by the National Tiger Conservation Authority on 28 August 2010.

Geography

The reserve is located between latitude 8° 25' and 8° 53' N and longitude 77° 10' and 77° 35' E, about 45 km west of Tirunelveli City, and forms the catchment area for 14 rivers and streams.  Among these rivers and streams, the Ganga, Tambraparani, Ramanadi, Karayar, Servalar, Manimuthar, Pachayar, Kodaiyar, Gadananathi River, and Kallar form the backbone of the irrigation network and drinking water for the people of Tirunelveli, Turicorin and part of Kanyakumari District.  Seven major dams—Karaiyar, Lower Dam, Servalar, Manimuthar, Ramanadi, Gadananathi River and Kodaiyar—owe their existence to these rivers.

The reserve spans a range of 40 to 1,800 m in elevation. Agasthiyamalai (1681 m.) is in the core zone of the reserve.

Conservation 
KMTR forms part of the inter-state (Kerala and Tamil Nadu) Agasthyamalai Biosphere Reserve. This part of Agastya Mala hills in the core of KMTR is considered one of the five centres of biodiversity and endemism in India by the International Union for Conservation of Nature (IUCN).  The Western Ghats, Agasthyamalai Sub-Cluster, including all of Kalakkad Mundanthurai Tiger Reserve, is under consideration by the UNESCO World Heritage Committee for selection as a World Heritage Site.

The Ashoka Trust for Research in Ecology and the Environment has developed and implemented a conservation intervention program in KMTR to decrease local villagers' dependency on the forests for fuel to and build community awareness about the value of biodiversity in the area.

"Agasthya", the KMTR newsletter, includes updates on research projects and staff activities at KMTR.  The contents of the first issue included: "A Sanctuary for Cycas circinalis," "Tiger Almost," "Round in Agasthyamalai in Fourteen Days," "Corridors - It is Just Not for the Four Legged Furry Creatures," "Behaviour and Movement of Nilgiri Langur in the Upper Kodayar Range – KMTR," "Canopy News," "Agasthya Village Commons and Backyards to Meet the Biomass Requirements: An Experiment with Panchayat Raj and Women Collectives," "Bi-Lingual Field Guide Test Run," "Snippets from the Field," "Cullenia exarillata: A Keystone Species for Birds?" and "Tea, Tiger and Oranges".

Tigers are also protected in Tamil Nadu at Mudumalai National Park, Indira Gandhi National Park and Wildlife Sanctuary, Mukurthi National Park and Sathyamangalam Wildlife Sanctuary.

Flora and fauna 

KMTR has at least 150 endemic plants, 33 fish, 37 amphibians, 81 reptiles, 273 birds and 77 mammal species.  As per the 2018 census, the tiger population is 16 to 18. Other animals in the tiger reserve include leopards, elephants, Nilgiri tahr, Nilgiri langur, wild boar, chithal, sambar deer, leopard cat, jungle cat and 67 other mammal species.

Habitat use by the grey junglefowl (Gallus sonneratii) at Mundanthurai plateau, Tamil Nadu, was investigated from December 1987 to March 1988.

Settlements
The Kalakkad Mundanthurai Tiger Reserve has a large number of employees of the Electricity Board and Public Works Department who stay in three colonies and work at Karayar, Upper Dam, Servalar and Upper Kodayar reservoirs within the reserve.  Bombay Burmah Trading Corporation has a 33.88 km2 land in the core area of the reserve leased from singampatti zamin valid until 2028.  The company has tea and coffee plantations and three factories, and employs about 10,000 workers in the reserve.

There are several small estates and five Kani Tribal habitations, consisting of about 102 families.  About 145 hamlets situated within 5 km of the 110 km eastern boundary of the reserve are inhabited by 100,000 people.  There are about 50,000 cattle grazing out of these fringe villages, with a small number of cattle owned by the tea estate workers and residents of the electricity board colonies.

On 18 January 2018, the state government passed instructions to the Tirunelveli district collector and the state forest department to notify the entire area that originates at Thamirabharani river as a reserve forest. The state forest department sought the government to convert all tea estate areas leased out to private parties to be brought back under the forest cover. On 12 January 2018, the governor of the state declared new forest boundaries for Kalakad and Mundanthurai that caters water to five southern districts.

See also
 Tiger reserves of India

References

External links 
http://www.dinakaran.com/News_detail.asp?Nid=364291
Dinamani - Website opened for Kalakad Mundanthurai Tiger Reserve
Oneindia - Tourism Website for Kalakad Mundanthurai Tiger Reserve
http://www.thehindu.com/news/states/tamil-nadu/article2334108.ece
Kalakkad Mundanthurai Tiger Reserve

 	

Tiger reserves of India
Tirunelveli district
South Western Ghats montane rain forests
Wildlife sanctuaries of the Western Ghats
Wildlife sanctuaries in Tamil Nadu
1988 establishments in Tamil Nadu
Protected areas established in 2008